Varanga is a village in Karkala Taluk in Udupi district of Karnataka, India. According to the 2011 census, it has a population of 4,011. This village is an important Jain center.

Tourism

Kere Basadi 
Kere Basadi is a 12th-century temple, considered to be unique for being situated in the middle of a lake. The mulnayak of the temple is Parshvanatha, the 23rd Tirthankara. The temple is built in chaturmukha style, having four entrance and a chaturmukha idol. The temple also includes a Jain Matha.

Other Basadis 
Neminatha Basadi is a stone temple built in 9th century. The temple has a ornate torana housing an image of seated tirthankar. 

The Kathale Basadi, Mathada Basadi, and Chandranath Basadi are other important temples in the region dating back 1,000 years.

References

Citation

Sources 
 
 
  
 
 

Villages in Udupi district